Luis Enrique Carpio Ascuña (born 1930 in Arequipa) is a Peruvian teacher and politician. He was National Unity's candidate for Second Vice President at the 2006 Peruvian national election, running along with Lourdes Flores Nano. The ticket placed third and failed to qualify in the run-off.

He has been the Dean of the University of Santa María.

References 

Living people
People from Arequipa
1930 births
National Unity (Peru) politicians